John Laschinger is a veteran political organizer in Canada.  He is best known for organizing election campaigns and party leadership bids for a variety of candidates.  He has written a book on his views and ideas on campaigns, entitled: "Leaders & lesser mortals: Backroom politics in Canada".

In 1983, Laschinger was campaign manager for the Hon. John Crosbie, a candidate for leadership of the Progressive Conservative Party of Canada. In 1984, he was campaign manager for the Hon. Larry Grossman in his bid for leadership of the Progressive Conservative Party of Ontario, an effort he repeated for Mr. Grossman in the party's 1985 leadership campaign. Laschinger was a key organizer for Belinda Stronach's bid to lead the Conservative Party of Canada in 2004, and John Tory's bid to lead the Progressive Conservative Party of Ontario also in 2004.  He then worked as campaign manager for the Progressive Conservative Party of Ontario in the 2007 general election.

Laschinger also served other conservative politicians in Canada, including New Brunswick and Manitoba. After 2000, Laschinger worked as a campaign consultant for political leaders in several former Soviet republics.

Known for working with Conservatives, Laschinger was an important figure in the NDP-aligned David Miller's bid to become Mayor of Toronto in 2003 and was his campaign manager in 2006. For the 2010 Toronto mayoralty election, he served as campaign manager for Adam Giambrone, another Toronto politician with ties to the NDP, prior to Giambrone abandoning the race. He then supported City Councillor Joe Pantalone, also aligned with the NDP, in his unsuccessful run to become Toronto's mayor.

In 2014, Laschinger emerged as campaign director for Olivia Chow's mayoralty campaign. A former Toronto education trustee and city councillor, then NDP MP for Trinity-Spadina when husband Jack Layton was party leader (and briefly Leader of the Opposition in 2011 until his death from cancer), Chow resigned to return to Toronto politics. Under Laschinger, her campaign started as the front-runner but faltered when John Tory—Laschinger's client a decade before—entered the race.

References 

Canadian political consultants
Living people
Year of birth missing (living people)